Ongallur-II is a census town in the Palakkad district, state of Kerala, India. It forms a part of Ongallur gram panchayat. According to Census 2011 Ongallur II has a population of 26,273 of which 12,924 are males while 13,349 are females.

Demographics
Ongallur -II Census Town has population of 26,273 of which 12,924 are males while 13,349 are females as per report released by Census India 2011.

References
.    2.https://www.citypopulation.de/php/india-kerala.php?adm2id=3206Census towns in Palakkad district

Ongallur-II